Patayin sa Sindak si Barbara is an ABS-CBN primetime television series adapted from the movie, Patayin Mo Sa Sindak Si Barbara, originally starring Susan Roces in 1974 and later by Lorna Tolentino in 1995. It was supposed to be aired weekly in a mini-series format, which was aired from January 7 to 25, 2008 replacing Pinoy Big Brother: Celebrity Edition 2 and was replaced by Lobo but it was later placed on Primetime Bida.

This is the first installment of Sineserye Presents: The Susan Roces Cinema Collection.

This series was streaming on Jeepney TV YouTube Channel every 6:00 pm & 6:30 pm.

Original film and initial remake

The original film was made in 1974 starring Susan Roces.

Another film was made in 1995 starring Lorna Tolentino.

Plot

All their lives, Barbara always gave way to her younger half-sister Ruth so she would be accepted by her new family. When they were older, she met Fritz and they instantly fell in love with each other. But Ruth also wants Fritz. She told them she would kill herself if Fritz would not marry her. So Barbara again gave way and made Fritz marry Ruth even with a heavy heart. She stayed in the States as a hospital nurse, but one day she received a call from the Philippines saying that Ruth killed herself and it was witnessed by her only daughter Karen. She quickly came to the country to mourn with her stepmother and to take care of her currently unstable niece. But when she arrived, strange things start to happen. It seems that Ruth killed herself because of her paranoia that her husband is seeing Barbara in the States during his business trips. Ruth always knew that Fritz will always love Barbara and not her. To exact revenge on Barbara, she haunts the house through the doll, Chelsea and through her own daughter. She hurts and even kills all the people that are dear to Barbara until there is nobody left but Barbara herself.

Cast and characters

Main cast
 Kris Aquino as Barbara 
 Albert Martinez as Fritz Martinez
 Jodi Sta. Maria as Ruth Martinez

Supporting cast
 Susan Roces as Amanda
 Celine Lim as Karen Martinez
 Maja Salvador as Agnes Martinez
 Jay-R Siaboc as Dale
 Joem Bascon as John
 Kitkat as Tina Magbintang
 Tim Espinosa as one of the spirit questors
 Janvier Daily as Badong
 Eva Darren as Elsa Magbintang
 Chelsea as the possessed doll

Guest cast
 Eliza Pineda as Young Barbara
 Khaycee Aboloc as Young Ruth
 Chen Zenhric Dimayuga as Young Badong

Reception
Patayin Sa Sindak Si Barbara was successful in  both Metro Manila and nationwide viewing. Its pilot episode in Manila got a 27% rating, the highest was 32%, while the lowest was 24%.  According to AGB-Nielsen, its pilot episode in NUTAM, 35.4%, was the #10 Highest Pilot Episode since 2007.

DVD release
In February 2008, a DVD containing all 15 episodes of Patayin Sa Sindak Si Barbara has been available at records stores, through Star Home Video.

See also
List of programs previously aired by ABS-CBN
Sineserye Presents

References

External links
 
 Patayin Mo Sa Sindak si Barbara at the PinoyExchange Forums
 Patayin Mo Sa Sindak si Barbara at Telebisyon.net
 Patayin sa Sindak si Barbara Unofficial Episode Guide at Pinoy TV Junkie

ABS-CBN drama series
Philippine horror fiction television series
2008 Philippine television series debuts
2008 Philippine television series endings
Live action television shows based on films
Filipino-language television shows
Television shows about exorcism
Television shows about spirit possession
Ghosts in television
Television series by Star Creatives
Television shows set in the Philippines